Deep Forest may refer to:

Deep Forest, a musical group comprising French musicians Eric Mouquet and Michel Sanchez
Deep Forest (Deep Forest album), 1992, and the title song
Deep Forest (Do As Infinity album), 2001
"Deep Forest", a song by Nash the Slash on his album Children of the Night
Deep Forest Raceway, a track in the Gran Turismo series of video games